Davutpaşa Barracks were Ottoman Army barracks built in the 1800s and located at Davutpaşa neighborhood of Esenler district on the European part of Istanbul, Turkey. The building was used later as a shelter for immigrants during the Balkan Wars and as a military hospital during World War I. Today, it serves as a campus of Yıldız Technical University after its redevelopment.

References

Military installations established in the 1800s
Krikor Amira Balyan buildings
Buildings and structures of the Ottoman Empire
Buildings and structures in Istanbul
Barracks in Turkey
Military history of Istanbul
Military in Istanbul
Redevelopment projects in Istanbul
Esenler
Ottoman architecture in Istanbul
Yıldız Technical University